The 2019 Sam Houston State Bearkats football team represented Sam Houston State University as a member of the Southland Conference during the 2019 NCAA Division I FCS football season. Led by sixth-year head coach K. C. Keeler, the Bearkats compiled an overall record of 7–5 with a mark of 6–3 in conference play, tying for third place in the Southland. Sam Houston State played home games at Bowers Stadium in Huntsville, Texas.

Previous season
The Bearkats finished the 2018 season with a 6–5 overall record, and a 5–4 record in Southland play to finish in a four-way tie for fourth place.

Preseason

Preseason poll
The Southland Conference released their preseason poll on July 18, 2019. The Bearkats were picked to finish in fourth place.

Preseason All–Southland Teams
The Bearkats placed six players on the preseason all–Southland teams.

Offense

1st team

Nathan Stewart – WR

2nd team

Woody Brandom – TE/HB

Defense

1st team

Zyon McCollum – DB

2nd team

Erick Fowler – DL

Hunter Brown – LB

Royce See – LB

Post season All–Southland Teams

Offense

1st team

Woody Brandom – TE/HB

2nd team

Nathan Stewart – WR

Defense

1st team

Royce See – LB

Zyon McCollum – DB

2nd team

Erick Fowler – DL

Hunter Brown – LB

Schedule
Sam Houston State has scheduled 12 games in the 2019 season instead of the 11 normally allowed for FCS programs. Under a standard provision of NCAA rules, all FCS teams are allowed to schedule 12 regular-season games in years in which the period starting with Labor Day weekend and ending with the last Saturday of November contains 14 Saturdays.

Source:

Game summaries

at New Mexico

Oklahoma Panhandle State

at North Dakota

Incarnate Word

at McNeese State

vs. Stephen F. Austin

Lamar

Nicholls

at Central Arkansas

at Abilene Christian

Northwestern State

Houston Baptist

Ranking movements

References

Sam Houston State
Sam Houston Bearkats football seasons
Sam Houston State Bearkats football